Leaving This Planet is a double album by organist Charles Earland that was recorded in 1973 and released on the Prestige label.

Reception

Allmusic awarded the album 4 stars, stating: "A definite departure from the type of earthy, groove-oriented soul-jazz he usually embraced, Leaving This Planet is perhaps Charles Earland's most ambitious album – not necessarily his best, but certainly his most surprising. Responding to the fusion revolution, Earland plays keyboards and various synthesizers in addition to his usual Hammond B-3 organ and thrives in a very electric setting... he leaves no doubt just how much he's enjoying this surprising change of pace."

Track listing 
All compositions by Charles Earland except as indicated
 (A1) "Leaving This Planet" - 7:29  
 (A2) "Red Clay" (Freddie Hubbard) - 7:05  
 (A3) "Warp Factor 8" - 6:18  
 (B1) "Brown Eyes" - 11:45  
 (B2) "Asteroid" - 6:40  
 (C1) "Mason's Galaxy" - 7:17  
 (C2) "No Me Esqueca" (Joe Henderson) - 7:41  
 (C3) "Tyner" - 6:03  
 (D1) "Van Jay" - 8:36  
 (D2) "Never Ending Melody" - 9:45

Personnel 
 Charles Earland - organ, ARP and Moog synthesizers, clavinet (on track 3), soprano saxophone (on track 8), electric piano (on track 10)
 Eddie Henderson - trumpet (on tracks 1, 4, 6, 8)
 Freddie Hubbard - trumpet, flugelhorn
 Dave Hubbard - soprano saxophone, tenor saxophone, alto flute
 Joe Henderson - tenor saxophone
 Patrick Gleeson - ARP and Moog synthesizers
 Eddie Arkin (on tracks 1, 3, 4, 6, 8, 10); Greg Crockett (on track 2); Mark Elf - guitar
 Brian Brake (on tracks 3, 9, 10); Harvey Mason - drums 
 Larry Killian - percussion
 Rudy Copeland - vocals (on track 1)

References 

Charles Earland albums
1974 albums
Jazz-funk albums
Prestige Records albums